Yizhi Township is a township in Jinggu Dai and Yi Autonomous County, Yunnan, China.

Administrative division
As of 2016, the town is divided into nine villages: 
Zhonghe
Yixiang
Datian
Gonghe
Zhexing
Tangfang
Heping
Shizhai
Mangqian

Geography
It lies at the southern of Jinggu Dai and Yi Autonomous County, bordering Bi'an Township and Yongping Town to the west, Simao District and Ning'er Hani and Yi Autonomous County to the south, Weiyuan Town to the north, and Zhengxing to the east.

The Weiyuan River and Xiaohei River flow through the township.

Economy
The local economy is primarily based upon agriculture. The main crops of the region are rice, followed by corn and potato.

Demographics

As of 2020, the National Bureau of Statistics of China estimates the township's population now to be 14,182.

Tourist attractions
The Fairy Cave, Shrimp Cave and Bat Cave are main attractions in the township.

References

Bibliography

Divisions of Jinggu Dai and Yi Autonomous County